A seraph ("burning one"; plural seraphim ) is a type of celestial or heavenly being originating in Ancient Judaism. The term plays a role in subsequent Judaism, Christianity, and Islam.

Tradition places seraphim in the highest rank in Christian angelology and in the fifth rank of ten in the Jewish angelic hierarchy. A seminal passage in the Book of Isaiah used the term to describe six-winged beings that fly around the Throne of God crying "holy, holy, holy". This throne scene, with its triple invocation of holiness, profoundly influenced subsequent theology, literature and art. Its influence is frequently seen in works depicting angels, heaven and apotheosis. Seraphim are mentioned as celestial beings in the non-canonical Book of Enoch and the canonical Book of Revelation.

Origins and development

In Hebrew, the word saraph means "burning", and is used seven times throughout the text of the Hebrew Bible as a noun, usually to denote "serpent", twice in the Book of Numbers, once in the Book of Deuteronomy, and four times in the Book of Isaiah. The reason why the word for "burning" was also used to denote a serpent is not universally agreed upon; it may be due to a certain snake's fiery colors, or perhaps the burning sensation left by its venomous bite. Regardless, its plural form, seraphim, occurs in both Numbers and Isaiah, but only in Isaiah is it used to denote an angelic being; likewise, these angels are referred to only as the plural seraphim – Isaiah later uses the singular saraph to describe a "fiery flying serpent", in line with the other uses of the term throughout the Tanakh.

There is emerging consensus that the motifs used to display seraphs in Hyksos-era Canaan had their original sources in Egyptian uraeus iconography. In Egyptian iconography, the uraeus was used as a symbol of sovereignty, royalty, divinity and divine authority, and later iconography often showed uraei with wings. In the early monarchic period of Israel and Judah, Egyptian motifs were evidently borrowed by the Israelites en masse, as a plethora of personal seals belonging to classes ranging from commonfolk to royalty have been discovered, which incorporate several pieces of ancient Egyptian iconography, including the winged sun, ankh, the hedjet and deshret crowns of Upper and Lower Egypt, scarabs, and the uraeus cobra. These uraei often had four wings, as opposed to the Egyptian standard which only gave them two. These images have been connected with the seraphim angels associated with Isaiah's visions, or perhaps more directly to the aforementioned "fiery flying serpent", but this continues to be debated – and an image of serpentine seraphim clashes with Isaiah's own vision, which clearly envisioned seraphim with heads, legs, and arms.

The vision in Isaiah Chapter 6 of seraphim in an idealized version of Solomon's Temple represents the sole instance in the Hebrew Bible of this word being used to describe celestial beings. "... I saw also the Lord sitting upon a throne, high and lifted up, and his train filled the temple. Above it stood the seraphim: each one had six wings; with twain he covered his face, and with twain he covered his feet, and with twain he did fly." (Isaiah 6:1–3) And one cried to another, "Holy, holy, holy, is YHWH of hosts: the whole earth is full of His glory." (verses 2–3) One seraph carries out an act of ritual purification for the prophet by touching his lips with a live coal from the altar (verses 6–7) "And he laid it upon my mouth, and said, Lo, this hath touched thy lips; and thine iniquity is taken away, and thy sin purged."

The text describes the "seraphim" as winged celestial beings with a fiery passion for doing God's good work. Notwithstanding the wording of the text itself, at least one Hebrew scholar claims that in the Hebrew Bible the seraphim do not have the status of angels, and that it is only in later sources (like De Coelesti Hierarchia or Summa Theologiae) that they are considered to be a division of the divine messengers.

Seraphim appear in the 2nd-century BC Book of Enoch, where they are mentioned, in conjunction with cherubim, as the heavenly creatures standing nearest to the throne of God. In non-biblical sources they are sometimes called the Akyəst ( "serpents", "dragons"; an alternate term for Hell).

In the Second Book of Enoch, two classes of celestial beings are mentioned alongside the seraphim and cherubim, known as the phoenixes and the chalkydri ( khalkýdrai, compound of  khalkós "brass, copper" +  hýdra "hydra", "water-serpent"—lit. "brazen hydras", "copper serpents"). Both are described as "flying elements of the sun" that reside in either the 4th or 6th heaven, who have twelve wings and burst into song at sunrise.

In the Book of Revelation (4:4–8), the beasts are described as being forever in God's presence and praising him: "[A]nd they rest not day and night, saying, 'Holy, holy, holy, Lord God Almighty, which was, and is, and is to come." This account differs slightly from the account of Isaiah, stating in the eighth verse, "And the four beasts had each of them six wings about him; and they were full of eyes within". They appear also in the Gnostic text, On the Origin of the World.

In Judaism

The 12th-century scholar Maimonides placed the seraphim in the fifth of ten ranks of angels in his exposition of the Jewish angelic hierarchy. In Kabbalah, the seraphim are the higher angels of the World of Beriah ("Creation", first created realm, divine understanding), whose understanding of their distance from the absolute divinity of Atziluth causes their continual "burning up" in self-nullification. Through this they ascend to God, and return to their place. Below them in the World of Yetzirah ("Formation", archetypal creation, divine emotions) are the Hayot angels of Ezekiel's vision, who serve God with self-aware instinctive emotions ("face of a lion, ox, eagle"). Seraphim are part of the angelarchy of modern Orthodox Judaism. Isaiah's vision is repeated several times in daily Jewish services, including at Kedushah prayer as part of the repetition of the Amidah, and in several other prayers as well. Conservative Judaism retains the traditional doctrines regarding angels and includes references to them in the liturgy, although a literal belief in angels is by no means universal among adherents. Adherents of Reform Judaism and Reconstructionist Judaism generally take images of angels as symbolic.

A Judean seal from the 8th century BCE depicts them as flying asp (snake), yet having human characteristics, as encountered by Isaiah in his commissioning as a prophet.

In Christianity

Medieval Christian theology places seraphim in the highest choir of the angelic hierarchy. They are the caretakers of God's throne, continuously singing "holy, holy, holy". Pseudo-Dionysius the Areopagite in his Celestial Hierarchy (vii), drew upon the Book of Isaiah in fixing the fiery nature of seraphim in the medieval imagination. Seraphim in his view helped the Deity maintain perfect order and are not limited to chanting the trisagion. Taking his cue as well from writings in the Rabbinic tradition, the author gave an etymology for the Seraphim as "those who kindle or make hot"

The name seraphim clearly indicates their ceaseless and eternal revolution about Divine Principles, their heat and keenness, the exuberance of their intense, perpetual, tireless activity, and their elevative and energetic assimilation of those below, kindling them and firing them to their own heat, and wholly purifying them by a burning and all-consuming flame; and by the unhidden, unquenchable, changeless, radiant and enlightening power, dispelling and destroying the shadows of darkness

Origen wrote in On First Principles that the Seraphim, in the Book of Isaiah, are the physical representation of the Christ and the Holy Spirit. His rationale comes from the idea that nothing "can wholly know the beginnings of all things and the ends of the universe" aside from God. Origen concludes this section in writing about the Seraphim as beings that have the knowledge of God revealed to them which elevates the role of the Seraphim to divine levels:

Nevertheless whatever it is that these powers may have learned through the revelation of the Son of God and of the Holy Spirit-and they will certainly be able to acquire a great deal of knowledge, and the higher ones much more than the lower-still it is impossible for them to comprehend everything; for it is written, 'The more part of God's works are secret. This quote suggests that Origen believed the Seraphim are revealed this knowledge because of their anointed status as Son of God and the Holy Spirit. He was later criticized for making such claims and labeled a heretic by the Christian church. However, his theory about the Seraphim, as referred to in Isaiah, would be reflected in other early Christian literature, as well as early Christian belief through the second century.

Thomas Aquinas in his Summa Theologiae offers a description of the nature of seraphim:

The seraphim took on a mystic role in Giovanni Pico della Mirandola's Oration on the Dignity of Man (1487), the epitome of Renaissance humanism. Pico took the fiery Seraphim—"they burn with the fire of charity"—as the highest models of human aspiration: "impatient of any second place, let us emulate dignity and glory. And, if we will it, we shall be inferior to them in nothing", the young Pico announced, in the first flush of optimistic confidence in the human capacity that is the coinage of the Renaissance. "In the light of intelligence, meditating upon the Creator in His work, and the work in its Creator, we shall be resplendent with the light of the Cherubim. If we burn with love for the Creator only, his consuming fire will quickly transform us into the flaming likeness of the Seraphim."

Bonaventure, a Franciscan theologian who was a contemporary of Aquinas, uses the six wings of the seraph as an important analogical construct in his mystical work The Journey of the Mind to God.

Christian theology developed an idea of seraphim as beings of pure light who enjoy direct communication with God.

In Islam 

The Bearers of the Throne (ḥamlat al-arsh) are comparable to seraphim, described with six wings and four faces. Their affiliation is not always clear and sometimes their role is swapped with the cherubim. In a book called Book of the Wonders of Creation and the peculiarities of Existing Things, these angels rank the highest, followed by the spirit, the archangels and then the cherubim. The Bearers of the Throne are entrusted with continuously worshipping God. Unlike the messenger angels, they remain in the heavenly realm and do not enter the world.

Seraphim (Sarufiyyun or Musharifin) are directly mentioned in a hadith from Al-Tirmidhi about a conversation between Muhammad and God, during the Night Journey, concerning what is between the Heavens and the Earth, often interpreted as a reference to the "Exalted assembly" disputing the creation of Adam in Surah .

In Islamic traditions, they are often portrayed in zoomorphic forms. They are described as resembling different creatures: An eagle, a bull, a lion and a human. Other hadiths describes them with six wings and four faces. While according to a hadith transmitted from At-Targhib wat-Tarhib authored by ʻAbd al-ʻAẓīm ibn ʻAbd al-Qawī al-Mundhirī, the bearers of the throne were angels who shaped like a rooster, with their feet on the earth and their nape supporting the Throne of God in the highest sky. a number modern Islamic scholars from Imam Mohammad Ibn Saud Islamic University , and other institutes Yemen and Mauritania also agreed the soundness of this hadith by quoting the commentary from Ibn Abi al-Izz who supported this narrative.

Al-Razi identifies the seraphim with the angels around the God's throne, next to the cherubim. They circulate the throne and keep praising God. Ibn Kathir, on the other hand, identifies the seraphim with those who carry the throne, the highest order of angels. Robert Southey collected a story about Iblis (Satan) refusing to bow before Adam arguing he is "a seraph created from celestial fire".

In culture

Arts, entertainment, and media

 In the real time strategy game Supreme Commander (video game), Seraphim is the name given to a faction of aliens who represent the first contact of aliens to human civilization. After the first Seraphim are killed by human colonists, they launch a massive assault on humanity, which is the premise of the expansion, Supreme Commander: Forged Alliance.
In the strategy game Monster Train, the primary villain, Seraph the Traitor, is a transcended, six-winged being and the de facto ruler of Heaven. In a bid to bring peace and stability to the collective Realm of Heaven, Hell, and Humans, Seraph helps forge a mutual covenant between Heaven and Hell. He later betrays this agreement and invades Hell, massacring the Hellborne and imposing his moral absolutism upon the survivors.
Galeem, from the Super Smash Bros. Ultimate single-player campaign "World of Light", resembles a seraph. It is an ethereal being of light with six wings. Also, Galeem attempted to destroy everything in existence and turn everyone (except the fighters) into spirits.
In the voxel-based video game Vintage Story, the species of the main character are called Seraphs.
In Doom (2016 video game), it is mentioned that a Seraph blesses the Doom Slayer with great strength and speed. In Doom Eternal, it is confirmed that the character Samuel Hayden is in fact the Seraphim who blessed the Doom Slayer.
In The Bastard Executioner, the Order of Seraphim are charged with preserving and protecting Jesus Christ's nine-volume, handwritten Libro Nazareni (New Testament) from the Church, which, as Annora and Ventrishire's manor priest, Father Ruskin, discuss in episodes 7 ("Behold the Lamb / Gweled yr Oen") and 8 ("Broken Things / Pethau Toredig"), and 9 ("The Bernadette Maneuver / Cynllwyn Bernadette"), could be toppled by the book's release to the public. For that reason, the Church's leaders, such as Robinus, the Archdeacon of Windsor, and their Knights of the Rosebud/Rosula, have targeted both the book and its protectors to be hunted and destroyed. In episode 3, some young Welsh people who want to earn credibility with the rebels against the government unwisely masquerade as members of the Order of Seraphim, by adorning themselves with seraphim face paint and attack the Baroness' wagon and its knights, which causes repercussions throughout the season for those captured, for their village, and for those affected by escalated hunts for rebels and for members of the Order of Seraphim.
Seraphim are the name of a species within Tales of Zestiria. The main character, Sorey, is heavily implied to become one by the end.
The second phase of Dogma, from The Binding of Isaac: Rebirth, resembles a seraph, being a being with many wings that also uses light attacks. "Seraphim" is also the name of one of the attainable transformations in the game (gained by gathering a certain quantity of specific items), although it does not resemble a seraph aesthetically.
 Seraphs also appear in the CW TV show Supernatural (American TV series). They are shown as more powerful angels, but still weaker than an Archangel. When the angel Castiel (originated from "Cassiel") dies, he is brought back as a Seraph, although he still does not possess the power to go up against the archangel who killed him, Raphael.
Seraph is a supporting character in the second and third films of The Matrix Trilogy. Seraph is an exile program who is seen acting as a "guardian angel" of the Oracle, and is described as the personification of a sophisticated challenge-handshake authentication protocol which guards the Oracle.
In Mega Man Zero, Copy X transforms into a Seraph-like appearance in his second form.
In the Armored Core series, the villain Nine-Ball is featured as a recurring antagonist. Its second and most powerful form, debuting in Armored Core: Master of Arena, is known as Nine-Ball Seraph.
From the Street Fighter series, the character Gill uses a move called Seraphic Wing, in which he reveals six wings and unleashes godly energy that does several hits. In Street Fighter III, it is the strongest move in the game and can one-hit KO an opponent if they are not blocking. In, Street Fighter V, it is his critical art. While it cannot instantly defeat an opponent like before, it deals a lot of damage.
Seraph is also the name of the first Jewish superhero who debuted in Super Friends # 7 by E. Nelson Bridwell, Ramona Fradon, and Bob Smith in 1977.
 Multiocular O is an exotic glyph variant of the Cyrillic letter O. This glyph variant can be found in certain manuscripts in the Old Church Slavonic phrase "" ("many-eyed seraphim").
 LE SSERAFIM is the five-member K-pop girl group from HYBE and Source Music that debuted in 2022 whose name is partly inspired by the seraphim.
 The new model Pasifista in One Piece are called, and based on Seraphim
 In Destiny 2, the 19th season is titled Season of the Seraph, named after a team of human operatives, the Seraphs, who worked closely with central character Rasputin, an AI "Warmind", to ensure the safety of humanity.

Logos and mascots
Several Catholic schools use a seraph or a seraph-related symbol as their mascot:
 Koinonia Academy, Plainfield, New Jersey, United States
 Mater Dei Catholic Preparatory School, Middletown, New Jersey, United States
 St. Bonaventure High School, Ventura, California, United States
 St. Madeleine Sophie Catholic School, Bellevue, Washington, United States
Kingswood College in Randles Hill, Kandy, Sri Lanka, a public school, claims the seraph as its mascot. 
 Both the University of Pisa and Sapienza University of Rome, Italy, feature a seraph as their logo.

See also
 List of angels in theology

Notes

References

External links

 Jewish Encyclopedia: "Seraphim"
 The Seraphim Mosaic in Hagia Sophia
 

Angels in Christianity
Angels in Judaism
Angels in Islam
Book of Isaiah
Classes of angels
Dragons
Fire in religion
Middle Eastern mythology
Serpents in the Bible